Khezel District is a district (bakhsh) in Nahavand County, Hamadan Province, Iran. At the 2006 census, its population was 30,903, in 7,490 families.  The District has one city: Firuzan. The District has two rural districts (dehestan): Khezel-e Sharqi Rural District and Solgi Rural District.

References 

Nahavand County
Districts of Hamadan Province